Acyphoderes synoecae is a species of beetle in the family Cerambycidae. It was described by Chemsak and Noguera in 1997.

References

Acyphoderes
Beetles described in 1997